For the Kiss song see Sonic Boom (Kiss album)

When Lightning Strikes is a 1934 American action film directed by Burton L. King and Harry Revier and starring Francis X. Bushman Jr., Alice Dahl and J.P. McGowan.

Cast
 Francis X. Bushman Jr. as Matt Caldwell
 Alice Dahl as Helen Stevens
 J.P. McGowan as Lafe Broderick
 Tom London as Wolf
 Blackie Whiteford as Hunky
 William Desmond as Marshal Jack Stevens
 Marin Sais as Mrs. Stevens
 Murdock MacQuarrie as Jim Caldwell
 Lightning the Wonder Dog as Lightning

References

Bibliography
 Michael R. Pitts. Poverty Row Studios, 1929–1940: An Illustrated History of 55 Independent Film Companies, with a Filmography for Each. McFarland & Company, 2005.

External links
 

1934 films
1930s action films
American action films
Films directed by Burton L. King
Films directed by Harry Revier
American black-and-white films
1930s English-language films
1930s American films